Rebaudioside A (sometimes shortened to "Reb A") is a steviol glycoside from the leaves of Stevia rebaudiana that is 240 times sweeter than sugar. Rebaudioside A is the sweetest and most stable steviol glycoside, and is less bitter than stevioside. Stevia leaves contain 9.1% stevioside and 3.8% rebaudioside A.

The glycoside contains only glucose (to the exclusion of other commonly found monosaccharides) as its monosaccharide moieties. It contains four glucose molecules in total with the central glucose of the triplet connected to the main steviol structure at its hydroxyl group, and the remaining glucose at its carboxyl group forming an ester bond.

References 

Glucosides
Vinylidene compounds